Charity is an unincorporated community in southern Dallas County, in the U.S. state of Missouri.

The community is on Missouri Route M approximately one mile west of the Niangua River. The Charity School buildings lie about one-half mile north on a county road. Elkland is about six miles south on Missouri Route 38 and Buffalo lies about nine miles to the north-northwest.

History
A post office at Charity was established in 1884, and remained in operation until 1956. An early postmaster gave the community the name of his wife, Charity Sherrick.

References

Unincorporated communities in Dallas County, Missouri
Unincorporated communities in Missouri